John Day (5 March 1812 – unknown) was an English first-class cricketer active 1829–35 who played for Nottingham Cricket Club (aka Nottinghamshire). He was born in Nottingham and died in (unknown). He appeared in eight first-class matches.

References

1812 births
Date of death unknown
English cricketers
Nottingham Cricket Club cricketers